These are the late night Monday-Friday schedules on all three networks for each calendar season beginning September 1957. All times are Eastern and Pacific.

Talk shows are highlighted in yellow, local programming is white.

Schedule

United States late night network television schedules
1957 in American television
1958 in American television